Uncooked is a New York-based company most notable for their snarky and strange greeting cards. Founders and creators Natalie Carbone and Armand Prisco started the company in 2004 after quitting their jobs in advertising. In 2006, they helped create a new brand image for MTV reminiscent of their unique tone and animation style. They also created a few animated spots that aired during the 2006 MTV Video Music Awards.

Notable Fans
In 2007, Kelly Ripa expressed her love of the cards by handing out cards to celebrity guests Vince Vaughn and Anderson Cooper during their interviews on Live with Regis and Kelly. In 2008, gossip columnist Perez Hilton featured an animated version of one of their holiday greetings cards.

References

External links
Uncooked's Official Site
Uncooked on Facebook
Daily Candy Article

Greeting cards
American animation studios
Companies established in 2004